Bus transport in Szczecin – part of public transport, which connects city districts and city Szczecin with Police, Dobra, Kołbaskowo, Police, Kobylanka and Goleniów. Szczecin buses are operated by four companies on behalf of the ZDiTM (Zarząd Dróg i Transportu Miejskiego; Road and Public Transport Administration). The bus system has been in operation since 1928. Nowadays, in Szczecin and the surrounding area 73 bus lines are running, including 54 normal lines, 5 fast lines and 14 night lines.

Operators
 Szczecińskie Przedsiębiorstwo Autobusowe "Dąbie" – 10 Andrzeja Struga Street, Szczecin
 Szczecińskie Przedsiębiorstwo Autobusowe "Klonowica" – 5 Sebastiana Klonowcia Street, Szczecin
 Szczecińsko-Polickie Przedsiębiorstwo Komunikacyjne – 21 Fabryczna Street, Police
 PKS Szczecin – 4 Leona Heyki Street, Szczecin

History

Buses in pre-war city
For almost 50 years, public transport in Szczecin consisted only of a tram system. It changed in 1928, when the Stettiner Straßen-Eisenbahn Gesellschaft company, which already operated trams, launched the first suburban bus line, leading from Lotnisko (balloon loop) to Dąbie. First line was marked "A" (as Altdamm, German name of Dąbie). Bus lines have supported tram lines there, where construction of tram tracks was unprofitable. In 1936, the first city bus line opened, marked "S".

Routes in 1938:
 suburban
 A Flughafen (Lotnisko) – Altdamm (Dąbie)
 F Chausseehaus (Tor Kolarski) – Falkenwalde (Tanowo), through Polchow (Pilchowo)
 H Flughafen (Lotnisko) – Hökendorf (Klęskowo), through Finkenwalde (Zdroje)
 N Berliner Tor (Brama Portowa) – Neuenkirchen (Dołuje) (from 1929 to 1933 worked as U to Ueckermünde), through (Mierzyn)
 P Gotzlow (Gocław) – Pölitz (Police)
 Pd Flughafen (Lotnisko) – Podejuch (Podjuchy), through Finkenwalde (Zdroje)
 R Flughafen (Lotnisko) – Rosengarten (Kijewo), through Altdamm (Dąbie)
 urban
 S Adolf-Hitler Schule, Brunner Str. (Witkiewicza) – Friedeborn Str. (Kołłątaja), through Poniatowskiego, Traugutta, Wyspiańskiego and Skargi Street.
 SW Scheune (Gumieńce) – Wendorf (Słowieńsko), through: Wierzbowa, Wrocławska and Okulickiego Street.

In 1930, total length of routes was 101 km, including the longest bus line in history of Szczecin (61,5 km)—from Brama Portowa to Ueckermünde. In 1935, after reduction of the line and opening of new lines, total length of lines was 46,5 km and in 1939, 64 km. Bus stock in 1929 consisted of nine vehicles, in 1937 there were 21 buses.

During World War II, only two bus lines were running: to Tanowo and to Dołuje, probably there was also a line to Police. Bus lines were running instead of trams in streets destroyed by bombing in 1943 and in 1944. Bus transport in German Szczecin had stopped before 1944.

Buses in post-war city

After World War II, only two buses ran in Szczecin. Others had been damaged or were used for evacuation. The first post-war bus line was launched on 4 August 1947 (the route had been operated by pre-war bus Bussing) and ran from Kościuszki Square to Gumieńce. Public transport had been managed by Tramwaje i autobusy miasta Szczecina. In 1948 five lines were running, which led to Dąbie, Police, Żydowce, Stołczyn and Gumieńce, operated by buses: Büssing, GMC, Leyland (since 1948). In the 50s, a number of bus lines were running: Mavag, Star, San, Chausson, Škoda-Karosa, Renault, Nysa, Jelcz-Berliet and Jelcz 272. In 1955, marking of lines was changed from alphabetical to numerical. In the middle 60s, the first bus depot was built in Klonowica Street. Earlier buses had been stored in the tram depot in Kolomuba Street. Number of bus lines increased: in 1960 there were 10 lines, in 1964 were 16 lines (including one shortened: "bis"), in 1968 were 22 lines (including 3 bis-lines and one to Wyspa Pucka). In 1976, Miejski Zakład Komunikacyjny was transformed into Wojewódzkie Przedsiębiorstwo Komunikacji Miejskiej (WPKM), which also managed public transport in other cities of the voivodship. In 1978, construction of "Dąbie", the second bus depot in Szczecin was completed. Seven years later another bus depot opened—in Police. On 12 November 1981, the first Ikarus 280 buses began operation.  By 1990 almost 300 buses had been bought. Since 1985, night bus lines began supporting night tram lines. In the same year, the first Jelcz M11 buses appeared on routes.

List of bus lines in 1988 (night lines in 1985):
 51: Kołłątaja Pętla – Osiedle Arkonia
 52: Police Szkoła – Wyspa Pucka
 53: Gocław-Osiedle Bukowe
 54: Żydowce-Osiedle Arkonskie
 55: Zdunowo – Basen Górniczy
 56: Osiedle Kasztanowe – Heyki
 57: Kołłątaja – Warszewo
 58: Stocznia Warskiego – Gocław
 59: Golęcino – Elektrownia Pomorzany
 60: Stocznia Warskiego – Autostrada Poznańska
 61: Dworzec Główny PKP – Klucz
 62: Basen Górniczy – Wielgowo
 63: Kołłątaja – Skolwin
 64: Kniewska – Klucz-Autostrada
 65: Studzienna – Osiedle Słoneczne
 66: Osiedle Słoneczne – Klucz
 67: Ludowa – Karola Miarki
 68: Stocznia Warskiego – Pomorzany-Dobrzyńska
 69: Basen Górniczy – Zakłady Mięsne
 70: Zakłady Mleczarskie – Jezierzyce
 71: Osiedle Arkońskie – Osiedle Słoneczne
 72: Basen Górniczy – Śmierdnica
 73: Basen Górniczy – Zdunowo Dworzec
 74: Basen Górniczy – Osiedle Bukowe
 75: Krzekowo – Dworzec Główny PKP
 76: Osiedle Kaliny – Nabrzeże "Ewa"
 77: Osiedle Słoneczne – Osiedle Kasztanowe
 79: Basen Górniczy – Jezierzyce
 101: Jasienica – Plac Rodła
 102: Gocław – Police Szkoła
 103: Głębokie – Zakłady Chemiczne
 104: Podjuchy – Elektrownia Dolna Odra
 105: Dobra Szczecińska – Łukasińskiego Ogrody
 106: Jasienica – Police Rynek
 107: Osiedle Chemik – Plac Rodła
 108: Mierzyn – Przecław
 109: Police Szkoła – Police Rynek
 110: Gryfino (Piastów) – Elektrownia Dolna Odra
 111: Zajezdnia Police – Police Rynek
 : Zajezdnia Klonowica – Osiedle Słoneczne
 : Gocław – Police (ul. Grzybowa)
 : Osiedle Chemik – Zajezdnia Dąbie.

After 1989

Current situation

Lines

Normal lines
Normal bus routes are the largest part of bus transport and consist of 54 lines, numbered from 51 to 124.

Fast lines
Bus transport in Szczecin has also five fast lines, marked A, B, C, G and H.

Night lines
There are 14 night bus lines. Since 1996, night bus lines have been running instead of night tram lines.

External links

ZDiTM official website

Transport in Szczecin